A constitutional referendum was held in Northern Cyprus on 11 October 2020 alongside the first round of presidential elections. The proposed amendment would increase membership of the Supreme Court from eight to a maximum of sixteen. The amendment was rejected by 50.13% of voters.

Background
The 1983 constitution established a Supreme Court with eight members. In 2020 members of the court stated that its workload had doubled in the previous decade. A proposal was subsequently made in the Assembly of the Republic to amend the constitution to make the number of members of the court variable, with a minimum of eight and a maximum of sixteen. This was approved by a vote of 42–3 on 6 July. After approval of the amendments by the Assembly, the constitution required them to be approved in a referendum.

Results
With a 58.29% turnout, the changes were narrowly rejected by less than 300 votes, with 49.87% of voters in favour of the changes and 50.13% opposed.

References

Referendums in Northern Cyprus
Northern Cyprus
Constitutional referendum
2020s in Cypriot politics